This is a list of calypsos categorised by main topics.

"Calypso music has been used by Calypsonians to provide sociopolitical commentary. Prior to the independence of Trinidad and Tobago, calypsonians would use their music to express the daily struggles of living in Trinidad, critique racial and economic inequalities, express opinions on social order, and voice overall concerns for those living on the island. The Black lower class in particular used Calypso music to protest inequalities inflicted upon them under British rule and advocate for their rights. In response, Calypso music came to exist as a form of musical protest."

American presence in Trinidad and Tobago 
"Base (The)" (1958), Mighty Sparrow
"Brown Skin Gal" - "Brown Skin Girl" (1933), King Radio
"Gimme Back Me Dam Kimona" (1951), Mighty Growler
"Green Fig"  - "Mary, I am Tired and Disgusted" (1943), Lord Kitchener
"No Nationality" (1946), Atilla the Hun
"Roosevelt in Trinidad" - "FDR in Trinidad" (1936), Atilla the Hun
"Rum and Coca-Cola" (1945), Lord Invader
"Soldiers Came and Broke Up My Life (The)" (1945), Lord Invader
"What You Doing in My Gallery" (1945), Growling Tiger
"We Want Back Chagaramas" (1959), Nap Hepburn
"Yankee Dollar" (1946), Lord Invader 
"Yankees Gone" - "Jean and Dinah" (1956), Mighty Sparrow
"Yankee’s Back" (1957), Mighty Sparrow
"Yankee Harvest Is Over" (1945), Lord Beginner

Aspirations / Dreams 
"Buy Me a Zeppelin" (1945), Macbeth the Great 
"I Am Going to Buy a Bungalow" (1938), Roaring Lion
"I Don’t Want No Bungalow" (1938), Atilla the Hun
"I Want a Radio at Home" (1938), Black Prince
"I Want To Build a Bungalow" (1938), Codallo's Top Hatters
"I Want to Rent a Bungalow" (1938), Mighty Growler
"If I Won a Sweepstake" (1941) - Atilla the Hun

Christmas period 
"Bring de Scotch for Christmas" (1966), Lord Kitchener
"Christmas Coming" (1977), Chalkdust
"Christmas Greetings" (1966), Lord Kitchener
"Christmas Is a Joyful Day" (1937), Lord Executor
"Christmas Is Yours, Christmas is mine" (1981), Lord Relator
"Christmas Morning the Rum Had Me Yawning" (1939), Lord Beginner
"Christmas Nice" (1999), Mighty Shadow
"Christmas Time is Near" (1961), Lord Creator
"Father Christmas" (1966), Lord Kitchener
"It’s Christmas" (2009), Baron
"It’s Christmas again" (2010), Baron
"Jingle Bells Calypso" (1951), Lord Kitchener
"Father Christmas" (1959), Mighty Spoiler
"Merry Christmas to You" (1961), Lord Creator
"Neighbour Oye" (2018), Baron
"Oh What a Christmas" (2018), Crazy
"Paint Brush (De)" (1993), Kenny J.
"Paramin" (2008), Singing Sandra
"Parang Soca" (1979), Crazy
"Party for Santa Claus (A)" (1973), Lord Nelson
"Santa" - "Miss Santa" (1961), King Solomon
"Something Salt" (1977), Chalkdust

Corruption / Criminality 

"Ah Digging Horrors" (1974), Mighty Sparrow
"Ah Doh Rhyme" (2005), Chalkdust
"Ah Feeling Shame" (2009), Cro Cro
"Ah Not in Dat" (2009), Chalkdust
"Angry Land" (2017), Gypsy
"Apocalypse" (1981), Delamo
"Apology (The)" - "No Apology" (1995), Cro Cro
"Archie Boulay" (1938), Atilla the Hun (Patois)
"Baboo Lala" (1938), Roaring Lion 
"Bad Impression (A)" 1965, Lord Kitchener
"Bandit Factory (The)" (2006), Chalkdust
"Bernard" (1974), Chalkdust
"Black Man Killing Black Man" (1993), Black Stalin
"Caught in the Whirlwind" (2017), Karene Asche
"Cleansing Fire" (2017), Singing Sandra
"Cock O’Halloran" (1967), Mighty Clipper
"Collateral Damage" (2004), Kizzie Ruiz
"Congo Bara (Prisonier levez)" - "Kongo Bara (Pwizonnyé Lévé)" (1935), Keskidee Trio (Patois)
"Corporal Punishment" (1947), Atilla the Hun
"Corruption in Common Entrance" (1988), Cro Cro
"Dis Place Is Nice" (1975), Brother Valentino
"Dole Chadee Say" (2000), Cro Cro
"Equal Justice" (2006), Singing Sandra
"Every Shadow" (1985), Scrunter
"Family Size Coke" (1950), Mighty Sparrow 
"For Whom the Bell Tolls" (2003), Singing Sandra
"Good Citizen" (1992), Mighty Sparrow
"Ground Zero" (2002), Singing Sandra
"Gumbo Lai Lai" - "Gumbo Li Li" (1928), Lionel Belasco 
"Hell’s Yard and George Street Conflict" (1936), Growling Tiger
"High Cost of Living" (1957), Mighty Sparrow
"Hills Thrills (The)" (2015), Shirlane Hendrickson
"Honesty" (1966), Mighty Sparrow
"How to Stop Delinquency" - "How to Curb Delinquency" (1966), Mighty Leveller
"Hunt is On (The)" (2012), Duane O’Connor
"Jail Dem" (2002), Cro Cro
"Jail Them" (2002), Bally
"Jericho" (1978), Lord Kitchener
"Justice" (2020), Kurt Allen
"Kamla the Greatest" (2011), Crazy
"Law Is an Ass (The)" (1979), Short Pants
"Licensed Forearm" (1994), Luta
"Lip Service" (2017), Rondell Donawa
"Look How Trinbago Gone" (2013), All Rounder
"Mirror Mirror" (2005), Skatie
"Money Eh No Problem" (1978), Lord Shorty
"Money is King" (1935), Growling Tiger
"Murder Frenzy" (2020), Chalkdust
"Nature’s Plan" (1984), Johnny King
"No Bacchanal" (1965), Mighty Sparrow
"Not de Land" (2013), Sugar Aloes
"One Day Without a Murder" (2020), Singing Sandra
"One to Hang" (1973), Lord Kitchener
"Peace Seeker" (2015), Sean Daniel
"Peddlers" (1958), Lord Melody
"Pirates of Paria" - "Pirates in the Gulf of Paria" (1951), Lord Kitchener
"Police Get More Pay" (1959), Mighty Sparrow
"Race Track Scandal" (1955), Mighty Sparrow
"Run the Gunslingers" (1959), Lord Caruso
"Sam P" (1984), Mighty Sparrow
"Savage" (1987), Carl & Carol Jacobs
"Scape Fox (The)" (1987), Chalkdust
"Seven Skeletons Found in the Yard" (1938), Lord Executor 
"Shortcut Society" (2001), Chalkdust
"Sly Mongoose" (1946), Lord Invader
"Sodom & Gomorrah" (1982), Delamo
"Stanley Abbott" (1974), Lord Kitchener
"Staying Alive" (1987), Black Stalin
"Take the Number" (1979), Scrunter
"Take Over" (2019), Heather MacIntosh
"Tell the Authorities" (2007), Twiggy
"Ten Feet Ah Rope" (2003), Heather McIntosh
"Ten to One Is Murder" (1957), Mighty Sparrow
"Treasury Scandal" (1937), Atilla the Hun
"Twenty Years n' Twenty Strokes" (1989), Chalkdust
"Unsolved Murders" (1965), Mighty Bomber
"We Living in Jail" (1984), Penguin
"Western Rodeo" (2002), Gypsy
"Who Is in Charge" (1995), Sugar Aloes
"Who to Call" (2019), Brian London
"Witness" (2001), Brother Resistance
"Year for Love" (2018), Voice

Culture - Calypso / Carnival evolution 

"A Calypsonian" (2010), Brian London
"Ah Put on My Guns Again" (1976), Chalkdust
"Ancient Rhythm" (2003), Singing Sandra
"Banning of Records (The)" (1938), Atilla the Hun
"Bomber’s Dream" (1964), Mighty Bomber
"Brass Crown" (1957), Lord Superior
"Calypso Cricket" (1988), Chalkdust
"Calypso Music" (1987), David Rudder
"Calypso Rising" (1992), David Rudder
"Calypso War" (1958), Mighty Terror
"Can’t Buy Extempo" - "Yuh Cyar Buy One" (2009), Contender
"Caribbean Spirit" (1988), Gypsy
"Carnival Boycott" (1957), Mighty Sparrow
"Carnival Road March" (1951), Lord Kitchener
"Carnival Is the Answer" (1989), Chalkdust
"Category My Donkey" (2004), Devon Seale
"Censoring of Calypso Makes Us Glad (The)" (1938), Lord Executor
"Chalkie the Mailman" (2006), Chalkdust
"Chalkie the Teacher" (1976), Chalkdust
"Champions" (2018), Turner
"Chutney Soca" - "Chatnee Soca" (1987), Drupatee
"Cultural Controversy" - "Carnival Controversy" (1987), Singing Francine
"Culture" (1988), Tambu
"D’Blueprint" (2012), Mistah Shak
"Dat Soca Boat" (1979), Mighty Shadow
"Dem Judges" (2006), Brother Mutada
"Don’t Destroy Calypso Music" (1995), The Mighty Duke
"Ducking" (2015), Fadda Fox
"Everliving Calypso" (2007), Brother Mudada
"Excursion to Grenada" (1938), Roaring Lion
"Five Rules of Calypso (The)" (2001), Brother Valentino
"Flag Woman" (1976), Lord Kitchener
"Guests of Rudy Vallee" (1934), Atilla the Hun & Roaring Lion
"Her Majesty" (1978), Calypso Rose
"High Mass" (1998), David Rudder
"History of Carnival" (1935), Atilla the Hun
"How’s Dat" (2012), Chalkdust
"How to Sing Calypso" (1982), Chalkdust
"How to Win the Crown" (2019), Chalkdust
"If the Priest Could Play" (1967), Mighty Cypher
"Iron Band (The)" (1945), Atilla the Hun
"J’Ouvert Barrio" (1935), Roaring Lion (Some patois)
"Juba Doo Bai" - "Juba Dubai" (1977), Chalkdust
"Kaiso Gone Dread" (1991), Black Stalin
"Kaiso Kaiso" (2006) - Luta
"Kaiso Power" (1986), Chalkdust
"Kaiso Sick in the Hospital" (1993), Chalkdust
"Land of Calypso" - "Trinidad, the Land of Calypso" (1950), Roaring Lion
"Last Jour Ouvert" (1987), Chalkdust
"Last Year’s Happiness" (1966), Mighty Terror
"Long Live Calypso" (1973), Lord Superior
"Love Yuh Own" (1991), Ella Andall
"Man Want to Dance" (1986), Chalkdust
"Mas" (1965), Lord Melody
"Mecca (The)" (1987), Brother Mudada
"Meet Superblue" (2009), Fay-Ann Lyons
"Message to George Weeks" (1976), Chalkdust
"Misconceptions" (1993), Chalkdust
"Mr. Bissessar" (1988), Drupatee
"My Purpose" (2019), Brian London
"No Entry" (2020), Maria Bhola
"No Part Time Lover" (1986), Black Stalin
"Nobody Cares" - "They Don't Care About We" (2001), Black Stalin
"No Smut for Me" (1976), Chalkdust
"Old Time Calypso" (1998), Lord Kitchener
"One for the Savannah" (1992), Chalkdust
"One Song" (2007), Devon Seale
"Our Cultural Heritage" (1972), Chalkdust
"Outcast (The)" (1963), Mighty Sparrow
"Pack up Your Things and Go" - " Pack Yuh Bags" (1998), Luta
"Piranha" (2012), Tiny
"Play Me" (1977), Maestro
"Play Mr Pannist Play" (1994), Defosto
"Play My Music" (1978), Brother Mudada
"Politicians Love Calypsonians" -  "Politicians Love Calypso" (1999), Manchild
"Poor, Pious and Proud" (2014), Cro Cro
"Questionable Canon" (1948), Atilla the Hun
"Rainorama" (1973), Lord Kitchener
"Rate Rate Ray" - "Ra Tiray Tiray" (1941), Lord Invader 
"Real Bandits" (2016), Helon Francis
"Reply to the Ministry" (1969), Chalkdust
"Respect the Calypsonian" (1988), Gypsy
"Respect the Thing" - "Respect the Ting" (1982), Chalkdust
"Rhythm of a People" (1997), Gypsy
"Road (The)" (1963), Lord Kitchener
"Scrunting Calypsonian" (1978), Trinidad Rio
"Seeking Sparrow's advice" (2013), Duane O’Connor
"Shame Mr. Shak" (2012), Chalkdust
"She Want Me To Sing in She Party" - "Sing in She Party" (1987), Scrunter
"Sixty-Seven" (1967), Lord Kitchener
"Soca Warriors" - "Soca Warrior too" (2007), Chalkdust
"Sparrow Come Back Home" (1962), Mighty Sparrow
"Spirit of Carnival" (2016), Devon Seale
"St. Joan of Arts" (2008), Chalkdust
"Stage Gone Bad" (2020), Kes  (band) & Iwer George
"Sumintra" (1988), Rikki Jai
"Telephone Call" (1974), Chalkdust
"Tempo" - "Gimme More Tempo" (1977), Calypso Rose
"Tension" (1988), Mighty Shadow
"Tent Is it (The)" (2001), Chalkdust
"They Don’t Like the Government" (2000), Crazy
"They Don’t Make Them Like Me Anymore" (1991), Lord Pretender
"They Put Me So" (2019) - Chalkdust
"Too Much Quacks" (1986), Chalkdust
"Too Much Tempo" (1976), Chalkdust
"Too Young to Soca" (1986), Machel Montano
"True Calypsonian" - "True True Kaisonian" - "True True Calypsonian" (1966), Lord Pretender
"Two Chords & Leston Paul" (1988), Chalkdust
"Uncle Sam Own We" (1980), Chalkdust
"Vagabond" (2015), Ricardo Drue
"Vincentian Calypso King" (1963), Lord Blakie
"You Can’t Judge Culture" (1976), Chalkdust
"Warrior" (1977), Calypso Rose
"Wedding of the Century" (2014), Chucky
"What Is an Obscene Calypso?" (1944), Lord Pretender
"What Is Calypso" (1968) - The Mighty Duke
"What’s Wrong With Me" (2000), Mighty Shadow
"What the Hell You Want" (1987), Chalkdust
"Where Kaiso Went" (2004), Brother Valentino
"Who Next" (1972), Chalkdust
"Why I Sing" (2012), Singing Sandra
"Why Milo" (1975), Chalkdust
"Why We Attack" (1977), Chalkdust
"Wild Indian" (1945), The Duke of Iron

Culture - Calypso War / Extempo / Picong  

"Alexander the Murderer" (1960), Lord Melody 
"Arima Tonight, Sangre Grande Tomorrow Night" (1931), Wilmoth Houdini 
"Belmont Jackass" (1960), Lord Melody
"Calypso Invasion" (1945), The Duke of Iron
"Calypso War" (1946), Lord Invader, Macbeth the Great, The Duke of Iron
"Carnival Celebration" (1956), Small Island Pride 
"Corbeau Flying High" (1958), Lord Melody 
"Cowboy Melo" (1959), Mighty Sparrow 
"Cowboy Sparrow" (1959), Lord Melody
"Don’t Touch Me" (1961), Mighty Sparrow  
"Executor Doomed to Die" (1929), Wilmoth Houdini 
"Executor the homeless man" (1937), Wilmoth Houdini 
"Fire and Brimstone" (1936), Wilmoth Houdini 
"Fowl Thief Melo" (1961), Mighty Sparrow 
"Hangman’s Cemetery" (1962), Mighty Sparrow  
"Horse Race" - "Sparrow Melody Horse Race" (1962), Lord Melody 
"In the Morning" (1939), Mighty Growler 
"Loretto" (1929), Wilmoth Houdini 
"Madame Dracula" (1961), Mighty Sparrow 
"Mamaguille" - "Mamaguy" (1934), Atilla the Hun & Roaring Lion 
"Malnutrition Songsters" (1937), Wilmoth Houdini
"March" (1929), Wilmoth Houdini
"Marjorie" (1960), Lord Melody
"Melody Lie" (1961), Mighty Sparrow 
"More the Merrier (The)" (1993), Mighty Sparrow
"My Reply to Houdini" (1937), Lord Executor 
"No Royal Jail" (1961), Lord Inventor 
"On His Blindness" (1952), Lord Executor
"Picong Duel" (1957), Mighty Sparrow & Lord Melody 
"Renegades" (1961), Mighty Sparrow 
"Reply to Melody" (1958), Mighty Sparrow 
"Royal Goal" - "Royal Jail" (1961), Mighty Sparrow 
"Soca Pressure" (1985), Mighty Sparrow
"Song No. 99" (1928), Wilmoth Houdini
"Sparrow’s Nose" - "St. Lucian Women" (1960), Lord Melody
"Sparrow’s Sister" (1959), Lord Melody
"Sugar for Pan" (1986), Mighty Terror
"Ten Thousand to Bar Me One" (1939), Lord Invader 
"Texilia" (1936), King Radio & Growling Tiger
"They Say I Reign Too Long" (1938), Lord Executor
"Three Calypsonians" (1958), Mighty Sparrow 
"Trouble in Arima" (1954), Lord Kitchener 
"Turn Back Melo" - "Turn back Melody" (1960), Lord Melody 
"Ugliness" (1961), Mighty Dougla
"What They Get, They Will Take" (1963), Lord Blakie
"War" (1937), Atilla the Hun & Lord Caresser & Roaring Lion & Lord Executor
"War" (1979), Crazy
"War Declaration" (1934), Wilmoth Houdini
"Yuh Cyar Buy Extempo" (2009), Contender

Culture - Icons (Calypso / Carnival / Pan)
"Ah Miss de Bards" (2014), Chalkdust
"Ah Thief it from Kitch" (1974), Chalkdust
"Atilla’s Pen" (2011), Kurt Allen
"Before You Gone" - "Before you gone Birdie" (2016), Macomere Fifi
"Black Stalin Say" (2013), Kurt Allen
"For Kitchener's Sake" (2000), Chalkdust
"Formula" (2019), Pharaoh
"Godfather (The)" (2001), Mighty Bomber
"Hammer (The)" (1986), David Rudder
"Heroes" (2001), Denyse Plummer
"Is Wot" (2022), David Rudder
"Kaiso Kaiso" (2006), Luta
"Kitchener Say" (2001), Defosto
"One for Bertie" (2013), Helon Francis
"One More Kitchener" (2000), Defosto
"Pretender's Reminder" (2015), Mistah Shak
"Sartorial Elegance" (2007), Duane O'Connor
"Tribute to Kitchener" (2000), Lord Relator
"Tribute to Singing Sandra" (2021), Ajamu
"Tribute to Sundar Popo" (1995), Black Stalin
"Tribute to Winsford Devine" (2010), Crazy
"Trinity is My Name" (1994), Delamo
"Will (The)" (1982), Scrunter
"Wot Time it is" (2022), Aaron Duncan

Culture - Kalenda /  Stick Fighting 
"Bois" (2014), Mistah Shak
"Clear the Way When the Bamboo Play" (1938), Lord Caresser
"Fire Brigade - Water the Road" (1938), Atilla the Hun (Patois)
"Reine Maribone (La)" - "Larenn Maribone" (1939), Atilla the Hun (Patois)
"Scorpion" (1939), Atilla the Hun (Patois)
"Zingue Tala" - "Zing Gay Ta La La" (1937), Atilla the Hun (Patois)

Culture - Steelpan 

"Bass Man" (1974), Mighty Shadow
"Beat Of a Steelband (The)" (1946), Lord Kitchener
"Bottle and Spoon" (1981), Lord Relator
"Carenage Water" (1942), Lord Invader
"Guitar Pan (The)" (1997), Lord Kitchener
"Iron Man" (1990) - Lord Kitchener
"Mister Pan Maker" (1987), Black Stalin
"Music Pan" (2019), Mighty Sparrow
"No Pan" (1979), Lord Kitchener
"Pan in A Minor" (1987), Lord Kitchener
"Pan in Danger" (1985), Merchant
"Pan on the Moon" (2009), Scrunter
"Pan Talent" (1965), Mighty Terror
"Pan Woman" (2008), Singing Sandra
"Play One" - "Pan Shootout" (1979), Black Stalin
"Retrorama" (2011), Devon Seale
"Spree Simon" - "Tribute to Spree Simon" (1975), Lord Kitchener
"Steel and Brass" (1973), King Wellington
"Steelband (The)" (1948), Lord Kitchener
"Steelband Clash" (1953), Lord Blakie
"Steelband Jamboree" - 2Pan Jamboree" (1966), Mighty Terror
"Steel Band Music" (1964), Lord Kitchener
"Symphony on the Street" (1998), Lord Kitchener
"Tribute to Clive Bradley" (2006), Defosto
"Tribute to Pan Pushers" (2001), Lord Blakie
"War 2004" (2004), Defosto

Culture - Other 
"Ann Sheridan" (1947), Atilla the Hun
"Bionic Man" (1977), Maestro
"Bobby Sox Idol" (1928), Wilmoth Houdini 
"CNN Society" (1995), Chalkdust
"From Naipaul to Shame" (2002), Chalkdust
"Hulk" (2018), Blaxx
"Pussy Galore" (1965), Young Growler
"Sanford & Son" (1981), Mighty Sparrow
"Tarzan" (1959), Mighty Spoiler
"Tun Tun" (1982), Mighty Power
"Vice in Your Own Head" (1957), Lord Creator

Drugs 
"Coke Is Not It" (1986), Mighty Sparrow
"Coke Talk" (1988), Chalkdust
"Death for Sale" (1991), Arrow
"Drug Report" (1987), Chalkdust
"Future Belongs to Me (The)" - "I Am Drug Free" (1992), David Rudder
"Lucifer in Powder Form" - "Lucifer" (1986), Bally
"Rebecca" (1981), Blue Boy
"Soucouyant" (1992), Mighty Shadow
"Watch Out My Children" (1989), Ras Shorty I

Economy / Poverty 
"Ah, Gertie" (1937 ), Lord Caresser
"Ah Tired Do That" (1988), The Mighty Duke
"Bargee Pelauri" (1936), Roaring Lion
"Capitalism Gone Mad" (1983), Mighty Sparrow
"Commission’s report" (1938), Atilla the Hun
"Cyar Take Dat" (1996), Brother Resistance
"Devaluation" (1969), Chalkdust
"Dollar and the Pound (The)" (1950), Lord Beginner
"Five Year Plan" (1939), Atilla the Hun
"Flood (The)" (2020), Heather MacIntosh
"Food Distribution" (1947), Atilla the Hun
"Food Prices" (1980), Lord Relator
"Four Cents a Day" (1947), Atilla the Hun
"Full Extreme" (2017), Ultimate Rejects
"Here Now and Long Ago" - "Iere Now and Long Ago" (1935), Atilla the Hun & Lord Beginner
"I Don’t Know How the Young Men Living" (1937), Lord Executor
"Landlord and Bailiff" (1934), Atilla the Hun
"Laughing in the Ghetto" (2000), Pink Panther
"Miss Mary’s Advice" (1938), Growling Tiger
"Mr. Nankivell’s speech" (1938), Atilla the Hun
"Mr. Robinson and Lockjoint" (1964), Mighty Sparrow
"No Doctor, No" (1957), Mighty Sparrow
"No, Madame" (1971), Calypso Rose
"No More Bench and Board" - "No mo' bench and board" (1931), Wilmoth Houdini
"No Vacancy" (2006), Brian London
"Pay as You Earn" - "Paye" (1958), Mighty Sparrow
"Piece of the Action" (1976), Black Stalin
"Port of Spain Gone Insane" (1986), Chalkdust
"Poverty Is Hell" (1994), Mighty Shadow
"Rich Man Poor Man" (1960), Lord Brynner
"Rip Off" (1978), Mighty Sparrow
"Run Something" - "Piece of the Action" (1976), Black Stalin
"Send your Children to the Orphan Home" (1936), Roaring Lion 
"Shop Closing Ordinance" (1937), Lord Executor 
"Strike (The)" (1938), Atilla the Hun 
"Single Tone" (1932), Lionel Belasco 
"Tax Them" (1958), Lord Superior
"Trinidad the Godfather" - "Trinidad: The Caribbean Godfather" (1980), Mighty Swallow 
"Try a Screw to Get Through" (1936), Growling Tiger 
"Voices From the Ghetto" - "Crying in the Ghetto" (1999), Singing Sandra
"Wah Yuh Doing" (2017), Chuck Gordon
"Where Was Butler?" (1938), Atilla the Hun
"Worker’s Appeal" (1936), Growling Tiger
"You Can’t Get Away From the Tax" (1959), Mighty Sparrow

Education 
"Another Day in Paradise" (1997), David Rudder
"Change the System" (1995), Cro Cro
"Child Training" (1969), Mighty Composer
"Contribution" (2002), Sugar Aloes
"Dan Is the Man in the Van" - "Dan Is the Man" (1963), Mighty Sparrow
"Doh Waste it" (2010), Aaron Duncan
"Down the Road" (1938), Growling Tiger
"Education" (1967), Mighty Sparrow
"Education Is Key" (2017), Massive
"Empowerment" (2001), Singing Sandra
"Generation Next" (2016), Mistah Shak
"Ghetto of the Mind" (2009), Singing Sandra
"Idle Company" (1987), Gypsy
"Little Black Boy" (1997), Gypsy
"No Child Shall Be Left Behind" (2010), Singing Sandra
"No Respect" (2008), Singing Sandra
"Obey the Highway Code" (1965), Lord Magic
"Only the Fools" (2003), Heather McIntosh
"Parables" (1970), Mighty Sparrow
"Remember" - "Ma and Pa" (1962), Lord Creator
"School Days" - "Happy School Days" (1973), Mighty Sparrow
"To be an Icon" (2017), All Rounder
"Too Many" (2016), Gypsy
"Wash Your Hands" (1950), Roaring Lion 
"Watch the Mixture" (1983), Chalkdust
"We Pass that Stage" (1974), Mighty Sparrow

Environment 
"Mother Earth Crying" (1994), Baron
"Progress" (1980), King Austin
"Progress 2021" (2021), Crazy
"What to Do with the Environment" (1994), Chalkdust

Family Relations 
"Ah Love my Nani" (2014), Sharleene Boodram
"Chinese Children Calling Me Daddy" - "Chinese Children" (1965), Mighty Terror
"Dead Beat" (2018), Lady Watchman
"Don’t let me mother know" - "Take me down to Los Iros" (1935), Keskidee Trio
"Family" (1981), Lord Nelson
"Freddo" (1939), Atilla the Hun
"Gal Come Home With Me" (1941), Atilla the Hun
"He Not Dead Yet" (1962), King Fighter
"I Need a Man" (1928), Wilmoth Houdini
"Mama Popo" - "Doh Beat Mama Popo" (1959), Lord Brigo
"Marriage (The)" (1997), Black Stalin
"Mother and Daughter" (2016), Macomere Fifi
"Mother-in-law" (1967), Mighty Sparrow
"Mother’s Love (A)" (1941), Mighty Destroyer
"Mother’s Love" (1992), Mighty Sparrow
"Nobody Ain’t Go Know" (2007), Cro Cro
"Obey" (1979), Lord Brigo
"Par Quiea Mweh" - "Pa Kwiyé Mwen" (Don’t Call Me) (1990), Mighty Sparrow (Some patois)
"Shame and Scandal in the Family" - "Shame and Scandal" (1943), Sir Lancelot
"Shame and Scandal in the Family" - "Wau Wau" (1962), Lord Melody

Feminism 
 
"Abatina" (2016), Calypso Rose
"Ah Do Come So" (1978), Mighty Sparrow
"Ah Done with Dat" (1980), Signing Diane
"Black Woman" (1991), Ella Andall
"Bye Bye Blakie" (1969), Calypso Princess
"Careful What Yuh Ask For" (2011), Karen Asche
"Caribbean Man" (2000), Singing Sandra
"Coming Back to What" (2013), Marvellous Marva
"D’Signs" (2008), Spicey
"Debbie" (1975), Singing Francine
"Die With My Dignity" - "Die With Dignity" - "Dignity" (1987), Singing Sandra
"Do Dem Back" (1974), Calypso Rose
"Do so Eh Like So" (1965), Lord Brigo
"Engagement Ring" (1970), Calypso Rose
"Equaliser (The)" (1998), Singing Sandra
"Learn from Arithmetic" (2017), Chalkdust
"Leave Me Alone" (2016), Calypso Rose
"Me Eh Fighting" (2009), Bally
"Me No Want No Married Man" - "Me No Want" (1993), Calypso Rose
"Miss Pam" (1993), Calypso Rose
"Raperman Coming (The)" - "Raperman" - "Sexy Employers" (1984), Singing Sandra
"Rocket in Yuh Pocket" (1992), The Mighty Duke
"Run Away" (1978), Signing Francine
"Stone Cold Dead in the Market" - "He Had It Coming" - "Murder in the Market" - "Payne Dead" (1939), Wilmoth Houdini
"Survey (The)" (2018), Heather MacIntosh
"Throw Me Down" (1990), Drupatee
"Woman Is Boss" - "Who’s the Boss?" - "The Boss" (1988), Denyse Plummer
"Woman Is Not the Weaker Sex" (1941), Atilla the Hun
"Woman on the Bass" (1980), Scrunter
"Woman Rising" (1991), Easlyn Orr
"Women of the Land" (1979), Poser
"Women Their Own Worst Enemy" (2001), Singing Sandra
"You No Need Dem" (1993), Calypso Rose
"You’re Hurting Me" (1994), Bernadette Paul

Folklore / Shango 
"Bassman" (1974), Mighty Shadow
"Children Ting (The)" (1976), Mighty Shadow
"Devil Behind Me (The)" - "Leggo" (1940), Wilmoth Houdini (Patois)  
"Jumbie Jamberee" - "Zombie jamboree" - "Back to Back" (1953), Lord Jellicoe (Also Lord Intruder) 
"Jumbies" (1979), Mighty Shadow
"La Jobless" - "Labejeless Woman (The)" - "Lajobless Woman (The) - "Ladjablès"" (1938) - Lord Executor (Patois)
"Love in the Cemetery" (1962), Lord Kitchener
"Mamie Water" (1955), Lord Kitchener
"Obeah" (2020), Terri Lyons
"Obeah Man" - "Take Me to the Obeah Man" (1967), Mighty Sparrow
"Pay the Devil" (1994), Mighty Shadow
"Return of the Bassman" (1984), Mighty Shadow
"Shango" (1932), Roaring Lion
"Soucouyant" (1985), Crazy
"Sucoyen" (1933), Roaring Lion
"Three Friends' Advice" (1937), Lord Executor
"Through the Mirror" (1979), Mighty Shadow
"Trinidad Obeahman" (1929), Lionel Belasco
"Whap Cocoyea" (2004) Mighty Shadow
"Who Am I?" (2003), Sugar Aloes
"Witch Doctor" (2009), Mighty Sparrow
"Yoruba Shango" (1935), Growling Tiger

Food / Drink 
"Bargee Pelauri" (1936), Roaring Lion
"Chinese Food" (1964), Lord Blakie
"Chip Chip Water" (1941), King Radio
"Ice Man (The)" - "Ice Ice" (1960), Lord Melody
"Mango Vert" - "Manngo Vé"(1912), Lovey's String Band (Patois)
"Pepsi-Cola" (1947), Lord Invader

Grandstanding / Boasting 
"Art of Making Love" (1973), Lord Shorty
"Bois Bandé" - "Bwa Bandé" (1968), Mighty Sparrow
"Bull Pistle Gang" (1964), Mighty Sparrow
"Bullpistle" (1977), Maestro
"Dread Wizard" (1979), Mighty Shadow
"Drunk and Disorderly" (1972), Mighty Sparrow
"Iron Duke in the Land" (1914), Julian Whiterose
"No Kind ah Man At All" (1973), Mighty Sparrow
"Papa Chunks" (1941), Roaring Lion
"Rope" (1972), Mighty Sparrow
"Same Time Same Place" (1973), Mighty Sparrow
"Sweet Like Sugar Cane" (1928), Wilmoth Houdini
"Take Me to Trinidad" (1948), Lord Kitchener
"Village Ram (The)" (1964), Mighty Sparrow
"Whop Whap" (2018), All Rounder
"Woop Wap" (1964), The Mighty Duke

Health 
"Ah Fraid de AIDS" (1988), Mighty Sparrow
"Asian Flu" (1958), Mighty Wrangler
"Awakening" (The) (2021), Crazy
"Backyard Jam" (2021), Farmer Nappy
"Better Days" (2021), Patrice Roberts
"Doh JackAss the Scene" (2021), Devon Seale
"Ebola Scare" (2015), Myron B
"Extempo Quarantine Challenge" (2020), Amery Brown
"Extempo Quarantine Challenge" (2020), Brian London
"Extempo Quarantine Challenge" (2020), Devon Seale
"Extempo Quarantine Challenge" (2020), Heather MacIntosh
"Extempo Quarantine Challenge" (2020), His Majesty Baker Jr (First of the chain)
"Extempo Quarantine Challenge" (2020), Josef Paty
"Extempo Quarantine Challenge" (2020), Michelle Henry
"Extempo Quarantine Challenge" (2020), Raymond Ramnarine
"Extempo Quarantine Challenge" (2020), Roger Mohammed
"Extempo Quarantine Challenge" (2020), Singing Sandra
"Extempo Quarantine Challenge" (2020), Stacey Sobers
"Extempo Quarantine Challenge" (2020), Terri Lyons
"Extempo Quarantine Challenge" (2020), Lady Watchman
"Extempo Quarantine Challenge" (2020), Queen Victoria
"Fighting AIDS" (2005), Adesh Samaroo
"H.I.V" (2001), Mighty Shadow
"How I Spent My Time at the Hospital" (1938), Lord Executor
"Jaws" (1977), Lord Kitchener
"Melancholy" (2021), Nailah Blackman
"Ms Corona" (2020), G String
"Negative to Positive" (1992), Bryan Bumba Payne
"Pandemic" (2021), Brother Mudada
"Vaccine or Not" (2021), Kurt Allen
"What Corona Do" (2021), Contender

Humour / Puns 

"60 Million Frenchmen" (1996), Mighty Sparrow
"Ah Fraid Pussy Bite Me" (1987), Mighty Sparrow
"All Fool’s Day" (1958), Mighty Spoiler
"Arabian Festival" (1964), Lord Blakie
"Art of Making Love" (1973), Lord Shorty
"Ash Wednesday" (1983), Chalkdust
"Big Bamboo" (1965), Mighty Sparrow
"Bedbug Song (The)" (1953), Mighty Spoiler
"Bitin Insex" (2002), Ronnie McIntosh
"Body Wine" (2011), All Rounder
"Bomber’s Sister" (1960), Mighty Bomber
"Booboo Man" - Mama Look at Bubu - "Mama Look a Boo Boo" (1955), Lord Melody
"Bus Conductor (The)" (2001), Poser
"Cat Brain" (1954), Mighty Spoiler
"Centipede in the Bikini" (1967), Lord Blackhat
"China Man" (1971) Lord Christo
"Chinese Accident" (1963), Lord Blakie
"Chinese Cricket Match" (1956), Mighty Dictator
"Chinese Football Match" (1998), Trinidad Rio
"Congo Man" (1965), Mighty Sparrow
"Congo Pepper" (1977), Maestro
"Convoy" (1940), The Duke of Iron
"Corn Plum Plum" (1979), Lord Laro
"Creature From the Black Lagoon (The)" (1957), Lord Melody
"Curry Tabanca" (1987), De Mighty Trini
"Deputy" - "Deputy Essential" (1982), Penguin
"Dingo Lay" - "Dingolay" (1935), Keskidee Trio (Also Roaring Lion)
"Doctor Beckles" (1967), Lord Canary
"Dr. Kitsch" - "Needle (The)" (1963), Lord Kitchener
"Doggie" (2002), Anslem Douglas
"Dollar Wine" (1991), Collin Lucas
"Donkey City" (1942), Sir Lancelot
"Dumb Boy and Parrot" (1962), Lord Christo
"Dustbin Cover" (1978), Crazy
"Electrician (The)" (1975) - Crazy
"English Society" (1962), Mighty Sparrow
"Exchange No Robbery" (1961), Mighty Dougla
"Family Confusion" (1962), Mighty Dougla
"Fat Pussy Cat and Rat" - "Papa Rat" (2010), Mighty Sparrow
"Feeling It" (1984), Baron
"Fire in Me Wire" - "Fire in Meh Wire" (1967), Calypso Rose
"For Cane" - "Goin Fo' Cane" (1972), Gypsy
"Fork in Napkin" (2011), D-Daz
"Fountain of Youth" (1960), Mighty Spoiler
"Fresh Water Yankee" (1969), Mighty Cypher
"Frozen Chicken" (1956), Lord Christo
"Garlic Sauce" (2012), All Rounder
"Gemma on the Ferris Wheel" (1962), Mighty Sparrow
"Gimme the Ting" - "Gimme de Ting" (2000), Lord Kitchener
"Go Down" (2013), All Rounder
"Grinding Massala" (1958), Mighty Killer
"Hold de Pussy" - "Hold de Pussy Cat" (1967), Lord Blakie
"I Ain’t Gonna Do It No More" (1976), Roaring Lion
"Iron Man (De)" (1964), Mighty Zandolie
"Joan and James" - "Five Little Popos" (1964), Mighty Bomber
"Jonah and the Bake" (1957), Lord Melody
"Killer Bees" (1992), Lord Kitchener
"King Liar" (1977), Lord Nelson
"Kitch: Small Comb, Scratch Me Head" (1950), Lord Kitchener
"Laziest Man (The)" - "Lazy Man" (1961), Mighty Dougla
"Lie" (2007), Singing Sandra
"Lignum Vitae" (1925), Sam Manning
"Little Drummer Boy (The)" (1978), Lord Kitchener
"Lizard (The)" (1969), Mighty Sparrow
"Looking for Cups" (1991), Trinidad Rio
"Lucy Garden" (1998), Mighty Sparrow
"Mad People on a Train" (1967) – Mighty Prowler
"Mad Scientist" - "What the Scientist Say" (1962), Mighty Spoiler
"Man Family" - "Too Much Man Family" (1967) - Mighty Zandolie
"Man For Kim" (1976), Lord Shorty
"Mango Tree" (1951-1953), Lord Kitchener
"Mango Vert" (1963), Mighty Sparrow
"Manjhay" - "Manjé" (1989), Mighty Sparrow (some patois)
"Marabella Wedding" (1935), Growling Tiger
"Merchant of Venice" (1967), Mighty Zandolie
"Ms McCarthy party" (1981), King Wellington
"Missing Ball (The)" - "Guardian Contest (The)" (1939), King Radio
"Mount Olga" (1947), Lord Kitchener
"My Donkey Want Water" (1945), Macbeth the Great
"My Pussin" (1965), Lord Kitchener
"Mystery Band" (1993), Lord Kitchener
"My Boy Joey" (1965), Mighty Beaver
"Night Food" (1955), Bedasse (with Calypso Quintet) 
"No Job Suits Striker" - "Can’t Find a Job to Suit Me" (1958), Mighty Striker
"No More Calaloo" – "I Don’t Want No Calaloo" (1939), Mighty Growler
"No Toilet in Town" (1983), Chalkdust
"Once Upon a Time" (2003), Mighty Bomber
"Out the Fire" (1937), Roaring Lion
"Picking Sense From Nonsense" (1955), Mighty Spoiler
"Paul Yer Mudder Come" - "Paul Yuh Mother Come" (1990), Crazy
"Pounding Rice Fine" (1952), Mighty Spitfire
"Pussy Cat" (2019), Mighty Sparrow
"Queen’s Canary (The)" (1956), Mighty Sparrow
"Sally Sally Water" (1937), Roaring Lion
"Saltfish" (1976), Mighty Sparrow
"Saltfish Price" (1968), Lord Companero
"Saving That for Company" (1973), Lord Nelson
"Saxophone No.2" (1953), Lord Kitchener
"Sell the Pussy" (1992), Mighty Sparrow
"Severe Licking" (1971), Baron
"Simpson" (1959), Mighty Sparrow
"Soca in the Shaolin Temple" (1981), Blue Boy
"Soft Man" (1984), Penguin
"Soul Chick" (1973), Lord Funny
"Sparrow Dead" (1969), Mighty Sparrow
"Stickman (De)" (1966), Mighty Zandolie
"Stuttering Mopsy" (1970), Lord Brigo
"Supposin'" (1964), Mighty Composer
"Talking Baby" (1984), All Rounder
"Talking Backwards" (1953), Mighty Spoiler
"Taxi Driver" - "Taxi Driver in Venezuela" (1956), Small Island Pride
"Tie Tong Mopsey" (1946), Lord Kitchener (Previously sung by Sir Lancelot)
"Turn Around Baby" (1945), Roaring Lion
"Twin Brother" (1959), Mighty Spoiler
"Uncle Jo’ Gimme Mo'" (1928), Wilmoth Houdini
"Virginia’s Alzheimer" (2013), Chalkdust
"Webster’s Dictionary" - "Trinidad Dictionary" (1969), Mighty Conqueror
"Well Spoken Moppers" (1965), Mighty Sparrow
"Whip (De)" (1967), Mighty Zandolie
"Wife and Boat" (1974), Mighty Sparrow

Jump up / Carnival dancing / Bacchanal 

"Advantage" (2011), Machel Montano
"Ah Feeling" (2015), Lead Pipe & Saddis
"Ah Tell She" (1979), Poser
"Band of the Year" (2006), Patrice Roberts & Machel Montano
"Big Truck" (1997), Machel Montano
"Black Man Feel Like Party" - "Black Man Come to Party" (1991), Black Stalin
"Brown Sugar" (1979), Lord Melody
"Can You Feel It" (2016), Aaron Duncan
"Caribbean Connection" (1985), Merchant
"Carnival Come Back Again" (2000), Iwer George
"Carnival Coming" (1979), Count Robbin
"Come Leh We Jam" (1978), Calypso Rose
"Dead or Alive" (2005), Shurwayne Winchester
"Differentology" (2013),  Bunji Garlin
"Display" (2003), Fay-Ann Lyons 
"Endless Vibrations" (1974), Lord Shorty
"Ethel" (1981), Blue Boy
"Face to Face" (1988), The Mighty Duke
"Famalay" (2019), Machel Montano, Skinny Fabulous & Bunji Garlin
"Fantastic Friday" (2013), Superblue
"Fever" (1975), Lord Kitchener
"Follow the Leader" (1997), Nigel Lewis
"Free Up" (1989), Tambu
"Get On" (2008), Fay-Ann Lyons
"Give Me Pressure" (1989), Mighty Shadow
"Hot Hot Hot" (1982), Arrow
"Jab Jab" (1992), Superblue
"Jumbie" - "Ah See You" (2005), Scrunter
"Jumbie" (2007), Machel Montano
"Jump and Wave" (1995), Cro Cro
"Jump in the line" (1948), Lord Kitchener
"La La Jam" - "La La" (1976), Lord Nelson
"Like a Boss" (2015), Machel Montano
"Look De Band Coming" (2004), Shurwayne Winchester
"Lucy" (2015), Destra
"Mama Dis Is Mas" (1964), Lord Kitchener
"Margie" (1970), Lord Kitchener
"Mas in Madison Square Garden" (1971), Lord Kitchener
"Miss Mary" (1974), Mighty Sparrow
"Miss Tourist" (1968), Lord Kitchener
"Moving (To the Left)" (1996), Nigel Lewis
"My Parade" (2019), Mighty Sparrow
"No No We Eh Going Home" (1990), Tambu
"Oh Yay" (2016), Olatunji
"Ola" (2015), Olatunji
"Palance" (2010), JW & Blaze
"Party Done" (2015). Angela Hunte & Machel Montano
"Phenomenal" (2015), Benjai
"Pump Up" (2000), Superblue
"Pump Yuh Flag" (2012), Machel Montano
"Rack Me Rack Me" (1985), Rootsman
"Rock it" (1985), Merchant
"Sing Ram Bam" (1987), Gypsy
"Soca Kingdom" (2018), Machel Montano & Superblue
"Soca Movin’ On" (2008), Erphaan Alves
"Stranger" (2001), Mighty Shadow
"Take Your Clothes off" (1993), Spice & Company
"Tourist Leggo" (1976), King Short Shirt
"Trinidad" - "Right Hand" (2002), Naya George
"Turn Up" (2017), Bunji Garlin
"Two Days to Go" - "Two to Go" (1988), Lord Kitchener
"Waiting on the Stage" (2016), Machel Montano

LGBTQ 
"List (The)" (1985), Mighty Gabby
"Man Nicer Than Woman" (1963), Mighty Dougla
"Norman" (1978), Merchant
"Whoopsin" (1941), Roaring Lion
"Woman’s Sweeter than Man" (1928), Sam Manning

Machismo / Misogynist 
"Bad Woman" (1934), Roaring Lion
"Blood Is Thicker than Water" (1948), Lord Kitchener
"Both of Them" (1992), Mighty Sparrow
"Child Father" (1961), Mighty Sparrow
"Dog Bite You" (1978), Lord Kitchener
"Dolly Doray" (1967), Mighty Zandolie
"E Pete" - "I Piti" (1976), Lord Shorty (Some patois)
"Fall of Man" (1936), Roaring Lion
"Indrani" (1972), Lord Shorty
"I Want to Join in Matrimony" (1948), Lord Kitchener
"Jagabat Women" (1960), Mighty Bomber
"Jean Marabunta" (1959), Mighty Sparrow
"Keep the City Clean" (1959), Mighty Sparrow
"Levez Mako" (1970), Mighty Sparrow (Some patois) 
"Loving Woman Is Waste of Time" (1950), The Duke of Iron
"Lulu" (1959), Mighty Sparrow
"Man Centapee" - "Man Centipede" - "Female of the Species (The)" (1943), Atilla the Hun
"Man Smart (Woman Smarter)" - "Woman You Can't Fool My Man" (1936), King Radio
"Man with the Pepper Sauce Is Boss (The)" - "Pepper Sauce" (1987), Mighty Swallow
"Mary Ann" - "Marianne" - "All Day All Night" (1946), Roaring Lion
"May May" - "Mae Mae" (1960), Mighty Sparrow
"Monica Doo Doo" (1960), Mighty Sparrow
"Mr Rake and Scrape" (1960), Mighty Sparrow
"Mrs. Harriman" (1972), Lord Kitchener
"Mr. Walker" (1968), Mighty Sparrow
"My Troubles with Dorothy" (1938), Lord Executor (Patois)
"Netty Netty" - "Nettie Nettie" - "Can’t Stand the Diggings" (1937), Roaring Lion
"No Money No Love" (1992), Mighty Sparrow
"Nothing for Nothing" - "Give to  Get" (1961), Mighty Sparrow
"Obeah Wedding" - "Melda" (1966) - Mighty Sparrow
"Old Men Come Back Again" (1939), King Radio
"Pretentious Women" (1964), Young Growler
"Raphaela" (1960), Mighty Sparrow
"Rats (The)" (1936), Growling Tiger
"Raycan" (1977), King Short Shirt
"Sa Sa Yay" - "Sa Sa Ay" - "Sa Sa Yé"(1969), Mighty Sparrow (Patois)
"Shake up" - "Shake Up Shake Up" (1977), Lord Brigo
"Sixteen Commandments" (1963), Lord Shorty
"Smoke a Cigarette" (1957), Lord Kitchener
"Spend Your Money Wise" (1962), Nap Hepburn
"Sugar Plum" (1978), Mighty Shadow
"Teresa" (1960), Mighty Sparrow
"Thirteen Year Old Mabel" (1956), Mighty Sparrow
"Thunder" - "Is Thunder" (1987), The Mighty Duke
"Twenty to One" (1974), Lord Kitchener
"Ugly Woman" - "Marry an Ugly Woman" - "Give an Ugly Woman Matrimony" (1934), Roaring Lion
"Vincentian Doreen" (1962), Mighty Sparrow
"Wife and Mother" (1954), Lord Kitchener
"Women and Money" (1962), Mighty Conqueror
"Women Police in England" (1951), Mighty Terror
"Women Will Rule the World" (1935), Atilla the Hun
"You Can’t Get Anything Out of Me" (1928), Sam Manning
"You Gotta Give Away" (1979), Singing Diane (written by Lord Kitchener)

National Identity - Pride & Hope 
"A Nation 31 Years Old" (1994), Delamo
"As a Nation Forges On" (1988), Denyse Plummer
"Belle Trinidad (La)" 1937, Atilla the Hun
"Change" (2018), Helon Francis
"Charming Trinidad" (1939), Roaring Lion
"Foreigner" (1978), Lord Nelson
"God Bless Our Nation" (1967), Lord Baker
"Great Nation" (2018), Myron B
"Holidays in Trinidad" (1967), Mighty Cypher
"I Am" (2019), Erphaan Alves
"I Believe" (2015), Chucky
"I Stand for Trinbago" (2008), Singing Sandra
"Land of the Humming Birds" (1928), Sam Manning
"National Pride" (1983), Chalkdust
"National Pride" (2002), Singing Sandra
"National Unity" (1996), Chalkdust
"Oh Land of Mine" (2006), Crazy
"Paradise" (2016), Helon Francis
"Paramaribo" (1937), Lord Caresser
"Soulful Calypso" (1977), Maestro
"They Can’t Beat We" (1989), Chalkdust
"Trini to the Bone" (2003), David Rudder
"We Is We" (1972), Chalkdust
"We’re Ten Years Old" (1972), Chalkdust

National Identity - Emigration 

"B.G. Blues" (1928), Sam Manning
"Barbados Blues" (1925), Sam Manning
"Bouncing Baby Boy" (1928), Sam Manning
"Brain Drain" (1968), Chalkdust
"Buggy Wuggy in California" (1947), King Radio
"Cold in the Winter" (1951), Lord Kitchener
"Food From the West Indies" (1950), Lord Kitchener
"Get Out" (2020), Tobago Crusoe
"Gin and Coconut Water" (1928), Wilmoth Houdini 
"Guyanese Come Back Home" (1967), King Fighter
"Jamaica Farewell" (1966), Lord Creator
"London is the Place for Me" - "Windrush" (1948), Lord Kitchener
"Lorraine" (1981), Explainer
"Mas in Brooklyn" (1969), Mighty Sparrow
"New York Subway" (1946), Lord Invader
"No More Taxi" (1951), Lord Kitchener
"Nora" (1950), Lord Kitchener
"Not Tonight" (2014), Pink Panther
"Prodigal Son" (2013), Chalkdust
"Stay Home West Indians" (1959), King Fighter
"Sweet Jamaica" (1948), Lord Kitchener 
"Uncle Sam’s Policy" (1983), Chalkdust
"Underground Train (The)" (1950), Lord Kitchener
"Wahbeen and Grog" (1962), Mighty Sparrow
"Windrush Coming Down" (2020), Clivus

National Identity - Immigration 
"Columbus Lied" (1989), Mighty Shadow
"False Papers" (2014), Bodyguard
"Immigration Problems" (1972), Chalkdust
"Indo Law Na Say So" (1959), Lord Inventor 
"Nah Leaving" (2001), Denyse Plummer
"Small Island" (1945), Lord Invader
"Too Botheration" (1938), Mighty Growler

News events - West Indies 
"Abu Bakr Take Over" (1991) Preacher
"Bandsman Shooting Case" (1934), Wilmoth Houdini
"Barking Beef" (2005), Shalleika Hazell
"Beyond the Boundary" (1993), M’ba
"Caroni Close Down" - "Caroni Close Dong" (2004), Adesh Samaroo
"Cipriani's and Bradshaw’s Death" (1934), Wilmoth Houdini
"Claude" (2020), Heather MacIntosh
"Clause Four" (1987), Mighty Trini
"Cock Fight" (1969), Mighty SparrowKing Radio
"Country Club Scandal" (1933), King Radio
"Cubana Crash (The)" (1977), Chalkdust
"Curfew Time" (1971), Lord Kitchener
"Do you Want a Watchman" (1994), Watchman
"Doc Secret Wedding" - "The Doc’s Wedding" (1959), Growling Tiger
"Drama Island" (2011), David Rudder
"Duke and Duchess of Kent (1935), Atilla the Hun
"Dynamite" (1934), Lionel Belasco
"Essence of Love (The)" (1976), Chalkdust
"Fire Fire" - "Calypso Coup" (1991), Bally
"Freaking Streaking" (1980), The Mighty Duke
"Get Something and Wave" (1991), Superblue
"Good Will Flyers" (1934), Atilla the Hun
"Graf Zeppelin" (1934), Atilla the Hun
"Guest List (The)" (2020), Michelle Henry
"Hang Him" (1976), Chalkdust
"Hosay Massacre (The)" (2021), George Rampersad
"Hoosay" (1991), David Rudder
"Is Butler Married" (1948), Atilla the Hun
"Jack" - "Dah Beach is Mine" (1982), Mighty Gabby
"Jamaica Hurricane" (1951), Lord Beginner
"Janelle ‘Penny’ Commissiong" (1978), Lord Kitchener
"Lieutenant Julian" (1928), Sam Manning
"Looting in B.G." (1962), Mighty Cypher
"Maxi Dub" (1993), Bally
"Message to George Weeks" (1976), Chalkdust
"Ministry of the Road" (2014), Machel Montano
"Not in Here" (2020), Duane O’Connor
"Not Martin" (2020), Makenda Marius
"Oh Grenada" (2014), Cro Cro
"Oil Cyar Spoil" (2019), Tamika Darius
"Post Another Letter For Thelma" (1952), Mighty Spitfire
"Sa Gomes’ Emporium"' (1935), Keskidee Trio
"Say a Prayer for Abu Bakr" (1991), Cro Cro
"Skyscraper" (1961), Mighty Sparrow
"Some Came Running" (1976), Maestro
"Telco Poops" (1978), Mighty Penguin
"Traffic Jam" (1987), Gypsy
"Treasury Fire" (1933), Lionel Belasco
"Tribute to Princess Margaret" (1958), Mighty Striker
"Trinidad Hurricane" (1933), Wilmoth Houdini
"We Shall Rise Again" (2005), Super P
"Welcome to Chinatown" (2020), Signing Sonia
"Who in de Zoo" (2012), Contender
"Wounded National Pride" - "Manningitus" (2011), Chalkdust

News events - World 
"1990" (1990), David Rudder
"Aid Haiti" (2010), Kizzie Ruiz
"Ban the Hula Hoop" (1959), Mighty Striker
"Ben Lion" (2002), André Tanker
"Birth of Ghana" (1956), Lord Kitchener
"Crown Heights Justice" (1992), Mighty Sparrow
"De Infidel" (2010), Short Pants
"Doh Touch Me President" (1999), Mighty Sparrow
"Edward the VIII" - "King Edward the VIII" (1937), Lord Caresser
"His Majesty King George the 6th Coronation" (1937), Atilla the Hun
"I Was There at the Coronation" - "I was There" (1953), Young Tiger
"Innocent Jimmy" (1989), All Rounder
"Jonestown Massacre" (1979), Chalkdust
"Lieutenant Julian" (1928), Sam Manning
"Magistrate Try Yourself" - "Magistrate Try Himself" (1958), Mighty Spoiler
"Megan my Dear" (2020), Terri Lyons
"New Orleans" (2006), Brother Mudada
"New York City Blackout" (1978), Mighty Sparrow
"Nigerian Registration" (1955), Lord Kitchener
"O.J. Simpson" - "Juice Is Loose (The)" (1996), Mighty Sparrow
"Phillip My Dear" - "Man in de Bedroom" (1983), Mighty Sparrow
"Potatoe" (1993), David Rudder
"Prince Rainer" (1956), Lord Invader
"Royal Divorce" (1996), Mighty Sparrow
"Ruby" - "Missing Baby (The)" (1955), Mighty Sparrow
"Russian Satellite" (1958), Mighty Sparrow
"Shaka Shaka" - "Shaka" (1988), Bally
"Skylab" (1979), Charlie's Roots
"Tantie Merle" (1979), Chalkdust
"Terrorism Gone Wild" (1986), Calypso Rose
"War of Worlds" (2018), Ras Commanda

Politics - Before Independence (West Indies) 
"Adrian Rienzi" (1938), Atilla the Hun
"Britain, Give us our Freedom" (1950), Atilla the Hun
"Christmas Eve Night on Quarry Street" (1947), Atilla the Hun
"Class Legislation" (1920), Cromwell The Protector
"Commission’s Report" (1938), Atilla the Hun
"Cooks in Trinidad (The)" (1930), Wilmoth Houdini
"Dalley's Report" (1948), Atilla the Hun
"Daniel Must Go" (1950), Growling Tiger
"Don’t Blame the PNM" (1958), Mighty Striker
"General Election" (1950), Lord Beginner
"Governor Jerningham" (1898), Lord Persecutor
"Governor’s Resignation (The)" (1938), Atilla the Hun
"King George’s Silver Jubilee" (1935), Lord Beginner
"Labour Situation in Trinidad (The)" (1939), Growling Tiger
"Leave the Dam Doctor" (1959), Mighty Sparrow
"Million Dollar Jail" (1947), Atilla the Hun
"Present Government" (1961), Mighty Sparrow
"Sedition Law" (1940), King Radio
"Water Scheme Workers" (1934), Growling Tiger
"We Mourn the Loss of Sir Murchison Fletcher" (1938), Lord Executor
"Wear Your Balisier" (1961), Mighty Sparrow
"Worker’s Appeal" (1936), Growling Tiger

Politics - Federation (West Indies) 
"Cry of the West Indies" (1968), Young Killer
"Federated Islands" (1956), Mighty BomberMighty Bomber
"Federation" (1951), Lord Beginner
"Federation" (1957), Lord Kitchener
"Federation" - "We Are as One" (1958), Mighty Sparrow
"Federation" - "What’s Federation" (1956), Small Island Pride
"Grenada Crisis" - "Grenada Must Join" (1964), Mighty Sparrow
"Montego Bay Conference" (1947), Atilla the Hun
"Referendum" - "Jamaican Referendum" (1962), Lord Laro
"Take Your Meat of my Rice" (1967), Lord Kitchener
"West Indian Federation" (1937), Atilla the Hun

Politics - From Independence (West Indies) 

"3 Bo-Rats" (1988), Cro Cro
"Abu Bakr" (1991), Mighty Sparrow
"Advice to the Boss" (2016), Cro Cro
"Ah Can’t Bury Williams" - "I Can’t Bury Eric Williams",(1999), Chalkdust
"Ah Fraid Karl" (1972), Chalkdust
"Ah Lost Roy" (2002), Chalkdust
"Ah Put on Me Guns Again" (1976), Chalkdust
"Ah Ready to Go" (1998), Sugar Aloes
"All Yuh Look for Dat" (1996), Cro Cro
"Aloo Sing" (2013), De Fosto
"Bad John Willie" (1980), Chalkdust
"Balance (The)" (2003), Mystic Prowler
"Balance Wheel" (1982), Calypso Rose
"Barking Dogs" (1973), Brother Valentino
"Better Days" - "Better Days Are Coming" (1984), Black Stalin
"Betty Goaty" (1982), Penguin
"Break Down Party" (1980), Black Stalin
"Boat Road" (2016), Myron B
"Boots" (1983), Mighty Gabby
"By Other Men’s Fault" (2016), Heather MacIntosh
"Call Dem Out" (2014), Brian London
"Call to Prayer (The)" (2017), Queen Victoria
"Caribbean Unity" - "Caribbean Man" (1979), Black Stalin
"Chambers" (1980), Explainer
"Chauffeur Wanted" - "New Driver Cannot Drive (The)" (1989), Chalkdust
"Check the Foundation" (2006), Luta
"Clear Your Name" (1974), Chalkdust
"Crapeaud Revolution" (1981), Scrunter
"Deaf Panman" (1974), Lord Relator
"Dey Lucky Ah Have Children" (1988), Chalkdust
"Diary of a Mad Man" (2011), Calypso Prince
"Doctor Ent They" - "De Doctor Eh Dey" (1965), Lord Blakie
"Dread Man" (1977), Maestro
"Eric Loves Me" - "Eric William Loves Me" (1979), Chalkdust
"Eric Williams Dead" (1988), Chalkdust
"Eye Problem" (2010), Chalkdust
"F.D.A.T" (2014), Devon Seale
"Fishmonger" - "Chalkie the Fishmonger" (2004), Chalkdust
"Final Send Off" (2017), Cro Cro
"From Then to Now" (1987), Mighty Shadow
"Game Show Politics" (2013), Devon Seale
"Get to Hell Outa Here" - "Get to Hell Out" (1965), Mighty Sparrow
"Goat Mouth Doc" (1972), Chalkdust
"Good Driving" (1994), Luta
"Good Manning Mr Manning" (1992), Rootsman 
"Grenada" - "Under Siege" (1984), Mighty Sparrow
"Grenada Man" (1984), Mighty Sparrow
"Guest List (De)" (2014), Chalkdust
"Hostage" (2017), Vigilanté
"I Carmona" (2017), Devon Seale
"I Eric Eustace Williams" (1982), Crusoe
"I in Town Too Long" (2005), Chalkdust
"I Love You" (2007), Maria Bhola
'In Just Six Years" (2003), Skatie
"Independence" (1962), Mighty Dougla
"Independence" - "Trinidad and Tobago Independence" - "Independence Calypso" (1962), Lord Brynner
"Jubilation" (2002), Sugar Aloes
"Just So" (2003), Chalkdust
"Kicksin in Parliament" (1979), Explainer
"Last Election" (1967), Mighty Cypher 
"La Trinity" - "Don’t Cry for Me" (1990), Denyse Plummer
"Let the Games Begin" (2000), Brother Valentino
"Let the Jackass Sing" (1974), Chalkdust
"Luta’s Advice" (2010), Heather MacIntosh
"Madness" - "St Ann’s" (2018), David Rudder
"Manning Must Go" (2010), Crazy
"Massa Day Must Done" - "Missa Day Must Done" (1974), Chalkdust
"Moo Moo Talking" (1996), Third Eye
"More Mad than Me" (2017), Myron B
"Mr Panday Needs Glasses" (1997), Watchman
"Mr Trinidad" (1974), Maestro
"My Corn Tree" (2017), Kurt Allen
"My Hart and I" (2009), Chalkdust
"My Humble Plea" (1985), Devon Seale
"My Way of Protest" (1977), Chalkdust
"New Portrait of Trinidad" (1972), Black Stalin
"No Winners" (2002), Denyse Plummer
"Not a damn Seat for Them" (1982), Lord Kitchener
"Not a Damn Seat for Them" (1982), Lord Pretender
"On Turning 50" (2012), Singing Sandra
"One Day" (1986), Natasha Wilson
"Only Games" (2018), Jahson I Am
"Our Model Nation" - "Model Nation" (1962), Mighty Sparrow
"Picture Picture" (2006), Skatie
"Plight of My People" (2017), Lady Gypsy
"PNM Loves Me" (1973), Chalkdust
"PNM March" (1977), Lord Kitchener
"Political Lightning" (2012), Bunny B
"Political Sin Phony" (2013), Kurt Allen
"Political Wonder" (1970), Mighty Bomber
"Portrait of Trinidad" (1965), Mighty Sniper
"Ram the Magician" - "Ram D’ Magician" (1984), Chalkdust
"Reflections" (2008), Sugar Aloes
"Respect God’s Voice" (2016), Devon Seale
"Road Bad (The)" (2016), Chalkdust
"Road Protest" - "D’Asphalt" (2013), Mistah Shak
"Rose (The)" (1985), Chucky Gordon
"Rowley Letter (The)" - "Letter to Keith Rowley" (2003), Chalkdust
"Rowley Rowley" (2018), Tigress
"Sailing" (1987), Mighty Trini
"Sea Water and Sun" (1986), Chalkdust
"Selwin in the Garden Hiding" - "Adam in the Garden Hiding" (1996), Chalkdust
"Shango Vision" (1977), Chalkdust
"She’s Royal" (2012), Sugar Aloes
"Sinking Ship (The)" (1986), Gypsy
"Snake in the Balisier" (1983), Mighty Shadow
"Solomon Out" (1965), Mighty Sparrow
"Some Body Mad" - "Somebody Mad" (1973), Chalkdust
"Spranger’s Story (A)" (2013), Tobago Chalkie
"Steel Beam" - "We Like it So" (1982), Mighty Sparrow
"Strange Case of Madam Occhahontas and the Westminster Dreadlocks (The)" (1996), David Rudder
"Take a rest" (1980), Lord Relator
"Three Blind Mice" (1976), Chalkdust
"To Lloyd with Love" (1977), Chalkdust
"To Sir with Love" (1974), Maestro
"Too Bright" (2010), Kurt Allen
"Too Much Party" (2004), Chalkdust
"Trade Union" (1939), Growling Tiger
"Travel Woes" (2013), Pink Panther
"Trini Does Lie" (1986), Chalkdust
"Try Obeah" (1989), Chalkdust
"Tug O War Society" (2000), Chalkdust
"Two sides of a Shilling" (1971), Chalkdust
"Ungrateful Pastor" (2007), Bodyguard
"Vision 20/20" (2002), Karene Asche
"Vote Dem Out2 (1986), Déplé
"Uncle Jack" (2011), Karene Asche
"Wajang" - "Yuh Ain’t See Wajang Yet" (2009), Tigress
"We’re Ten Year Old" (1972), Chalkdust
"We Doh Want It" (1992), Cro Cro
"We Kinda Leader" (1987), Chalkdust
"Wey you Think" (2014), Chucky Gordon
"Wha Yuh Doing" (2017), Chucky Gordon
"When Elephant Fight" (2019), Gypsy
"When Mas Was Mas" (2010), Chalkdust
"Why ah Stay" (2000), Sugar Aloes
"Why I Left, Why I Returned" (1974), Lord Superior
"William the Conqueror" (1957), Mighty Sparrow
"Woman to Woman" (2011), Tigress
"Wrap Spoon and Fork in Napkin" (2019), Hunter

Politics - USA 
"American Election" (1945), Atilla the Hun
"Barack the Magnificent" (2007), Mighty Sparrow
"Black Coffee" (2009), Lord Superior
"Death of Kennedy" (1964), Mighty Sparrow
"Jump for Jesse" (1988), Mighty Sparrow
"Kennedy and Khrushchev" (1963), Mighty Sparrow
"Martin Luther King" (1968), Black Stalin
"Martin Luther King" (1970), Mighty Sparrow
"Martin Luther King for President"  (1964), Mighty Sparrow
"Muhamed Ali" (1971), Samson the Lark
"Obama the First" (2009), Sugar Aloes
"One for Obama" (2009), Twiggy
"Watergate" (1973), Mighty Cypher
"Weapons of Mass Dis-Illusion" (2007), Mighty Sparrow

Politics - World (Other) 
"Ayatolah" (1981), Mighty Sparrow
"B.G. War" (1962), Mighty Sparrow
"Burn Dem" (1992), Black Stalin
"Castro No not Trinidad" (1963), Lord Christo
"Democracy in Haiti" (1995), Mighty Sparrow
"Free South Africa" (1989), Mighty Shadow
"Heaven" (1995), David Rudder
"How Many More Must Die" - "How Many More" (1986), The Mighty Duke
"Idi Amin" (1978), Mighty Sparrow
"Invade South Africa" (1985), Mighty Sparrow
"Isms Schims" (1984), Black Stalin
"Isolate South Africa" (1982), Mighty Sparrow
"Leaders on the Run" (1987), Gypsy
"Lift the Iron Curtain" (1958), Lord Ivanhoe & his Caribbean Knights
"London Bridge" - "London Bridge is Falling Down" (1980), Mighty Sparrow
"Madiba" (2014), Singing Sandra
"More Come" (1986), Black Stalin
"Satan in Control" (1988), Gypsy
"Stay up Zimbabwe" (1979), Brother Valentino
"Undemocratic Rhodesia" (1971), Samson the Lark
"Victory is certain" (1991), David Rudder
"Vile Doctrine" (1964), Lord Brynner
"Wanted Dead or Alive" (1980), Mighty Sparrow

Promotion / Advertising 

"Coffee Coffee" (1945), Atilla the Hun
"Diamond T" (1945), Atilla the Hun
"Rum Is Macho" (1980), Mighty Sparrow

Racial identity / Slavery 

"101%" (2019), De Mighty Trini
"Africa" (1955), Lord Beginner
"Africa My Home" (1951), Lord Kitchener
"African Love Call" (1934), Wilmoth Houdini
"Ambataila Woman" (1991), United Sisters
"Answer to Black Power" - "Answer for Black Power (The)" (1968), Chalkdust
"Belle Marie Coolie" - "Bèl Mawi Kouli" (1914), J. Resigina - aka Julian Whiterose (Patois)
"Black Child’s Prayer" (1983), Chalkdust
"Black Identity" (1973), Maestro
"Black Inventions" (1979), Chalkdust
"Black Is Beautiful" (1969), The Mighty Duke
"Black Power" (1971), Lord Kitchener
"Black Power in Trinidad" (1971), The Mighty Duke
"Body Parts" (1997), Trinidad Rio
"Children of a Lesser God" (2020), Crazy
"Crisis in Arkansas" (1959), Lord Invader
"Emancipation" (1933), Lionel Belasco
"Emancipation" (2018), Dunstan Carwash Lawrence
"Emancipation Centenary" (1933), Atilla the Hun
"Emperor of Africa (The)" (1954), Mighty Terror
"Ganges and the Nile" (1999), David Rudder
"Glorious Centenary" (1934), Wilmoth Houdini
"God Made Us All" (1947), Lord Invader

"Guardian Beauty Contest" (1955), Atilla the Hun
"Heart Transplant" (1969), King Short Shirt
"Heading North" (1958), Mighty Terror
"Human Rights" (1979), Mighty Shadow
"If You’re Not White You’re Black" - "Black or White" (1953), Lord Kitchener
"Imitation Rasta" (1979), Funny
"Jahaji Bhai" (1996), Brother Marvin
"Jahaji Blues" (1997), Gregory Ballantyne
"Message of 70's (The)" (1977), Chalkdust
"Mr. African" (1976), Explainer
"My Grandfather’s Backpay" - "Grandfather’s Backpay" - "Grandpa’s Pay Day" (1985), Chalkdust
"Mock Democracy" (1966), Lord Cristo
"No Freedom" (1970), Lord Kitchener
"No Revolution" (1971), Brother Valentino
"Nothing Come Easy" (1982), Black Stalin
"Phrase (The)" (2017), Terri Lyons
"Racism" (2007), Mighty Sparrow
"Say my Name" (1997), Ella Andall
"Slave (The)" (1962), Mighty Sparrow
"Song for Healing" (1999), Singing Sandra
"Song for We" - "Sing ah Song for We" (2008), Brian London
"Sons and Daughters of Africa" (1952), Lord Beginner
"Split Me in Two" (1961), Mighty Dougla
"Still Colonial2 (2017), Meguella Simon
"Straight Hair Girl" (1950), Lord Beginner
"Sufferers" (2000), Black Stalin
"Sweet Like a Honey Bee" (1928), Wilmoth Houdini
"Teach the Children" (1976), The Mighty Duke
"Theme for African Liberation" (1977), Chalkdust
"They Ain’t See Africa at All" - "They Ain’t African at All" (1984), Chalkdust
"Twentieth Century Greats" - "20th Century Greats" (1976), Chalkdust
"Um Ba Ya Oh2 - "Um Ba Yao" (1978)
"Unite African" (1990), Mighty Shadow
"White People Laughing at We" (1987), Chalkdust

Religion - Christian / Gospelypso 
"Ezekiel Coming" (2017), Calypso Rose
"Go Down the Valley" (1935), Keskidee Trio
"His Holy Name" (2003), Mighty Sparrow
"I Am What I Am" (2017), Calypso Rose
"I Used to Be a Sinner" (2003), Mighty Sparrow
"Miracle of Jesus" (2003), Mighty Sparrow
"One Super Power" (2010), Tony Barclay
"Salvation" (1983), Blue Boy
"Salvation" (1994), Mighty Sparrow
"Soca Baptist" (1980), Blue Boy
"Temptation of Christ" (2003), Mighty Sparrow
"When the Roll is Called up Yonder" (1984), Chalkdust
"Who God Bless" (1978), Ras Shorty I
"Wisdom of Christ" (2003), Mighty Sparrow

Religion - Others 
"Hard Hard Hard" (1986), Black Stalin
"Judge Me Not" (2008), Singing Sandra
"Om Shanti Om" (1979), Lord Shorty
"One Day of Prayer" (2004), Singing Sandra
"Power in Song" (2018), Singing Sandra
"Ras Mass" (1981), Explainer
"Rastaman" - "Rastaman Be Careful" (1979), Lord Melody
"Rastamania" (1978), Mighty Sparrow
"True Colours" (2000), Singing Sandra

Social commentaries - Others 
"Accident Policy" (1976) Lord Funny
"Always Marry a Pretty Woman" (1946), Lord Beginner
"Better Days" (2018), Aaron Duncan
"Blaze de Fire" (2005), Bunji Garlin
"Class Language" (2009), Kizzie Ruiz
"Eat your Cake and Still Have It" (2007), Skatie
"Good Time Pioneers" (2005), Brother Mudada
"I thank Thee" (1978), Calypso Rose
"No Front Page" (2018), Duane O’Connor
"Old Lady Walk a Mile" - "Old Lady Walk a Mile and a Half" (1951–1953), Lord Kitchener
"Philantropy" (2021), Crazy
"Scratch Meh Back" (2000), Mighty Shadow
"Social Media" (2017), Lady Adana
"Suzie Jumbie" (1962), Mighty Sparrow
"Sudan" (2007), Singing Sandra
"That Good, That Bad" - "Dat Good, Dat Bad" (1990), Chalkdust
"White People’s Bacchanal" (1957), Mighty Viper
"Woman Woman" (1977), Cro Cro
"Wrong Name (De)" (2019), Sexy Suzie

Spirituality / Philosophy 
"Ah Living Meh Life" (1962), Mighty Dougla
"Bring Down the Power" (2010), Ella Andall
"Clean Heart" (2008), Singing Sandra
"Death Is Compulsory" (1948), Lord Kitchener
"Hands" (2008), Singing Sandra
"I Will Die a Bachelor" (1950), Lord Beginner
"If ah Coulda" (2007), Mighty Shadow
"In Time to come" (2000), Crazy
"In Times" (1995), Black Stalin
"Journey" (1989), Tambu
"Journey of the Enabler" (2019), Singing Sandra
"Learn to Laugh" (1984), Chalkdust
"Life" (1988), Gypsy
"Life Is a Stage" (1972), Brother Valentino
"Look at the Bright Side" (1991), Black Stalin
"Love Thy Neighbour" (1937), Roaring Lion
"Man’s Imagination" (2019), Ronaldo London
"Never Ever Worry" (1961), Lord Pretender
"Never Hang Your Hat" (1967), Lord Christo
"People Will Talk" (1962), King Fighter
"Song for the People" (1991), Ella Andall
"Survival" (1992), Mighty Sparrow
"You Can’t Stop Pleasing People" (1959), Lord Commander

Sports - Cricket 

"Alec Bedser Calypso" (1951–1953), Lord Kitchener
"Beyond a Boundary" (1993), MBA
"Blackwash" (1985), Roots Man
"Blood Money" (1986), Commenter
"Brian Lara" (1995), Watchman
"Constantine" (1929), Wilmoth Houdini
"Cricket Champions" (1967), Lord Kitchener
"Cricket Song (The)" (1964), Lord Kitchener
"Denis Compton" (1951), Lord Kitchener
"Four Lara Four" - "Laramania" (1995), Defosto
"Gavascar" (1972), Lord Relator
"Here Come the West Indies" (1994), David Rudder
"John Goddard" (1950), Lord Beginner
"Kerry Packer" (1978), Mighty Sparrow
"Kerry Packer Cricketers" (1978), All Rounders
"Knock Them Down" (1977), Maestro
"Legacy" (1995), David Rudder
"Mickey Cipriani’s Career" (1934), Wilmoth Houdini
"Rally 'Round the West Indies" (1988), David Rudder
"Signal to Lara" (1995), Superblue
"Sir Garfield Sobers" (1966), Mighty Sparrow
"Smiling Eyes of Steel" (2000), David Rudder
"South Africa" (1983), Tobago Crusoe
"Tiger Tom Kill Tiger Cat" (1932), Wilmoth Houdini
"Victory Calypso" - "Victory Test Match" - "Cricket, Lovely Cricket" (1950), Lord Beginner

Sports - Others 
"ATO" - "Ato Boldon" (1996), G.B. (Gregory Ballantyne)
"Ato’s Gold" (1998), Denyse Plummer
"Crawfie" - "Crawford" - "Halsey Crawford with a Bullet" (1977), Mighty Sparrow
"Crawford is the Man" - "Halsey Crawford" (1977), Lord Kitchener
"Fighter" (2006), Maximus Dan
"Games" (2017), Heather MacIntosh
"Gold" (1976), Maestro
"Gold Coast Champion" (1950), Lord Beginner
"Granny" (1986), Natasha Wilson
"Javelin Jam" (2013), Mistah Shak
"Is Only Sports" (1995), Kurt Allen
"Keep Fit" - "Keep Fit Man" (1983), All Rounder
"Keshorn" - "Javelin Champion (The)" (2013), Eunice Peters
"Louis Schmeling Fight" (1937), Atilla the Hun
"Muhammad Ali" (2002), Mr. Calypso
"Play Ball" (1960), Lord Christo
"Randolph Turpin's Victory" (1951), Lord Kitchener
"Road to Italy" (1989), Superblue
"World Cup" (1976), Maestro

Tabanca / Lover's quarrel 
"Tabanca, tabanka, tabankca, tobanca (n) (Grenada, Guyana, Trinidad): A painful feeling of unrequited love, from loving someone who does not love in return, especially someone who was once a lover or spouse."
"After Carnival" (1980), Lord Kitchener
"Beef and Bone" (1934), Atilla the Hun
"Come Le We Go Sookie" (1964), King Fighter
"Doh Back Back" (1984), Mighty Sparrow
"Doh Horn Meh" (1980), The Mighty Duke
"Dorothy" (1934), Atilla the Hun & Roaring Lion
"Dotish Married Man" (1963), Mighty Sparrow
"Fan Me Saga Boy" (1945), Roaring Lion
"Going Home Tonight" (1966), Mighty Sparrow
"Jenny" (1981), Lord Nelson
"Jimpy’s Ingratitude" (1938), Atilla the Hun
"Last Train to San Fernando (The)" - "Last Train" (1950), The Duke of Iron
"Love Me Emily" - "Emily" (1939), Atilla the Hun
"Malic Wedding Scandal" (1962), King Solomon
"Maria" (1962), Lord Blakie
"Mathilda" (1938), King Radio
"Mr Herbert" (1963), Mighty Sparrow
"My Girl Mabel" (1941), King Radio 
"My Indian Girl Love" (1939), Lord Executor (Patois)
"No Nora Darling" - "Nora" - "Nora Darling" (1937), Roaring Lion
"No Woman No" (1986), Black Stalin
"Rose" (1961), Mighty Sparrow
"Rum Till I Die" (2003), Adesh Samaroo
"Stella" (1963), Lord Nelson
"Sugar Bum Bum" (1978), Lord Kitchener
"Tabanca" (2000), Denyse Plummer
"Take Your Bundle and Go" (1962), Mighty Sparrow
"Tell Me Why" (2013), Baron
"Way Way Out" (1999), Mighty Shadow

War - Up to end of World War II 
"Admiral Graf Spee (The)" (1940), Atilla the Hun
"Adolf Hitler" (1941), Mighty Destroyer
"Advantage Mussolini" (1936), Roaring Lion
"Black Market" (1945), Lord Beginner
"Britain Will Never Surrender" (1941), Mighty Growler
"Carnival Again" (1939), Lord Executor
"Chamberlain Says Peace" (1938), Lord Beginner
"Chinese Never Had a V.J. Day" - "Lay Fung Lee" - "Chinese Calypso" - "Chinese Memorial" - "Lai Fook Lee" (1948), Lord Kitchener
"Civil War in Spain" (1938), Growling Tiger
"Ethiopian War Drums" (1935), Wilmoth Houdini
"Fall of France" (1941), Mighty Growler
"Germany Invade Poland" (1939), King Radio
"Gold of Africa (The)" (1936), Growling Tiger
"Hitler" (1939), Lord Ziegfield
"Hitler Demanded Trinidad" (1940), Lord Invader
"Hitler Demands" (1939), Mighty Growler
"Hitler’s Attitude" (1940), Roaring Lion
"Hitler's Mistake" (1940), Roaring Lion
"Hitler’s Moustache" (1941), Lord Invader
"Horrors of War (The)" (1938), Atilla the Hun
"Housewives" (1950), Lord Beginner
"Invasion of Britain" (1941), Atilla the Hun
"Invasion of Poland (The)" - "Poland, Poland" (1940), Roaring Lion
"Let Them Fight for Ten Thousand Years" (1939), Growling Tiger
"Nazi Spy Ring" (1940), Mighty Growler
"Norah the War Is Over" (1946), Lord Beginner
"Poppy Day" (1938), Lord Executor
"Red Cross Society (The)" (1941), Atilla the Hun
"Reply to Englishman" (1944), Atilla the Hun
"Roosevelt’s Election" (1941), Atilla the Hun
"Run Your Run Hitler" (1940), Lord Beginner
"Selassie Is Held by the Police" (1937), Lord Caresser
"Send Hitler to St. Helena" (1940), Atilla the Hun
"Two Bad Men in the World" (1939), Lord Executor
"Warning to Russia (A)" (1950), Mighty Viking
"Winston Churchill" (1941), Roaring Lion

Wars - Post World War II 
"Children World" (1987), Chalkdust
"Hydrogen Bomb (The)" (1954), Mighty Terror
"My Lai Incident (The)" (1970), The Shah
"Peace in de World" (1987), Black Stalin
"Send Me Instead" (1968), King Fighter
"Stop D War" (2008), Singing Sandra
"War Mongers" (1988), Johnny King

References

See Also (For Additional Information)

Books
 
 
 
 
 
Liverpool, Hollis (Mighty Chalkdust) (1 June 1987). Calypsonians to Remember. Virgin Islands Commission. 
 
 
 
 
Maharaj, George (2007). The Roots of Calypso, Volume 2 - Another Passage Into the World of Calypso.Trinidad and Tobago Hi Tech Printers Inc. Ltd.
 
 
 
 
Pierre, Giselle. Calypso Chronicles: History Through Calypso I (2016). 
Pierre, Giselle. Calypso Chronicles: History Through Calypso II (2021). Independently published. 
 
Quevedo, Raymond (1994). Attila's Kaiso: A Short History of Trinidad Calypso. The University of Michigan.

Journals 
Aho, W. R. The treatment of women in Trinidad's calypsoes, 1969–1979. Sex Roles 10, 141–148 (1984). 
Austin, Roy. Understanding Calypso Content: A Critique and an Alternative Explanation. Caribbean Quarterly 22, no. 2/3 (1976): 74–83. 
Cowley, John Houston. Music & migration: Aspects of black music in the British Caribbean, the United States, and Britain, before the independence of Jamaica and Trinidad & Tobago. University of Warwick (April 1992). 
Dean, Darry. Calypso as a vehicle for political commentary: An endangered musical species. Carleton University, 2015.
Doley, Peter. = Calypso and the Bush. Flinders University of South Australia (26 01 2013), issue: Australian Literary Studies in the 21st Century.
Hill, Errol G. Calypso and War. Black American Literature Forum 23, no. 1 (1989): 61–88. https://doi.org/10.2307/2903988.
Liverpool, Hollis (Mighty Chalkdust). Researching Steelband and Calypso Music in the British Caribbean and the U. S. Virgin Islands. Black Music Research Journal (1994). 
Lowe, Agatha. Themes of War, Politics and Health Education in Calypso Music. Caribbean Quarterly 39, no. 2 (1993): 56–72.
 
Rohlehr, Gordon Calypso, Literature and West Indian Cricket: Era of Dominance. Anthurium, vol. 6, no. 1, 2008, p. 4. 
 
Sylvester, Meagan. Narratives of Resistance in Trinidad's Calypso and Soca Music. Caribbean Pelau - the University of the West Indies, St. Augustine Campus (2019), volume 11, issue 3
Toussaint, Michael. Trinidad Calypso as Postmodernism in the Diaspora: Linking Rhythms, Lyrics, and the Ancestral Spirits. Research in African Literatures. Indiana University Press (2009). Issue=1, volume 40, pages:137–144.
Winer, Lise. Socio-Cultural Change and the Language of Calypso. Nieuwe West-Indische Gids / New West Indian Guide 60, no. 3/4 (1986): 113–48.

Articles 
Dowrich-Phillips, Laura. 7 calypsoes that kept us entertained with hot topics of the day
Ferreira, Jo-Anne S. Hodge, Nnamdi. Patois in Calypso. Montray Créyol, 2015.
Hinds, David. A Mailman to make Government Understand: The Calypsonian (Mighty Chalkdust) as Political Opposition in the Caribbean. Michigan Publishing, 2010.
Ramm,Benjamin. The subversive power of calypso music BBC Culture, October 11, 2017  
Rohlehr,Gordon. A Scuffling of Islands: The Dream and Reality of Caribbean Unity in Poetry and Song - Roseau to Montego Bay The Integrationist Caribbean, 2007  
Unknown. A chronology of selected songs by Mighty Sparrow that address social, political and topical themes
Unknown. Celebrating our Calypso Monarchs 1939–1980 T&T - History through the eyes of Calypso. Trinidad & Tobago government, 2015/07.

Audio

External links 
Calypso Monarchs Hall of Fame
Calypsography
Calypsonians 1900 - 2018
Top 100 Calypsos of the 20th Century
Trinidad & Tobago Calypsonians

Sociopolitical influences
Lists of musical works
Music and politics
Music-related lists